Tirahi were the speakers of the Tirahi language, a nearly extinct if not already extinct Indo-Aryan language which may still be spoken by older adults, who are likewise fluent in Pashto, in a few villages in the southeast of Jalalabad in Nangarhar Province, Afghanistan. They were the previous inhabitants of Tirah and the Peshawar Valley in modern-day Khyber Pakhtunkhwa, Pakistan. 

The Tirahis were expelled from Tirah by the Afridi Pashtuns. Georg Morgenstierne claimed that Tirahi is "probably the remnant of a dialect group extending from Tirah through the Peshawar district into Swat and Dir."

See also
Orakzai
Pashtun tribes

References

History of Pakistan
Karlani Pashtun tribes
Social groups of Pakistan